Vincenza Procacci (born August 20, 1966) is an American former professional tennis player.

Raised in Lake George, New York, Procacci won five ITF doubles titles on the professional tour and featured in the doubles main draw of the 1989 Lipton International Players Championships, a WTA Tour tournament in Key Biscayne.

Procacci had a career high singles ranking of 446, along with a best doubles ranking of 213 in the world.

ITF finals

Doubles: 11 (5–6)

References

External links
 
 

1966 births
Living people
American female tennis players
Tennis people from New York (state)
People from Lake George, New York
21st-century American women